This is a record of Ukraine's results at the FIFA World Cup. The FIFA World Cup, sometimes called the Football World Cup or the Soccer World Cup, but usually referred to simply as the World Cup, is an international association football competition contested by the men's national teams of the members of Fédération Internationale de Football Association (FIFA), the sport's global governing body. The championship has been awarded every four years since the first tournament in 1930, except in 1942 and 1946, due to World War II.

The tournament consists of two parts, the qualification phase and the final phase (officially called the World Cup Finals). The qualification phase, which currently take place over the three years preceding the Finals, is used to determine which teams qualify for the Finals. The current format of the Finals involves 32 teams competing for the title, at venues within the host nation (or nations) over a period of about a month. The World Cup Finals is the most widely viewed sporting event in the world, with an estimated 715.1 million people watching the 2006 tournament final.

Ukraine has appeared in the FIFA World Cup 2006 where they reached the quarter finals. It was their first ever official appearance at an international tournament since breaking away from the Soviet Union in 1991. However, before 1996 some of its players played for the Soviet Union national football team and CIS national football team. Among few there were Oleksiy Mykhaylychenko, Hennadiy Lytovchenko, Oleh Luzhnyi, Ivan Hetsko and others.

Overall record

 Champions   Runners-up   Third place   Fourth place  

* Denotes draws including knockout matches decided via penalty shoot-out.

Ukraine at 2006 FIFA World Cup

At the 2006 FIFA World Cup, Ukraine was drawn in Group H along with Spain, Saudi Arabia, and Tunisia.

Head coach: Oleg Blokhin

 Serhiy Fedorov (#3) was injured before the start of the tournament. His replacement, Vyacheslav Shevchuk was also injured shortly after arriving as a replacement. Oleksandr Yatsenko was then called up, and sat on the bench for the last two matches.

Spain vs Ukraine

Saudi Arabia vs Ukraine
Andriy Rusol put Ukraine ahead in the fourth minute when the ball went in off his knee's at the near post after a corner from the right by Maksym Kalynychenko. Serhii Rebrov got the second goal after 36 minutes with a long range right footed shot that flew past the goalkeeper. Andriy Shevchenko then scored in the 46th minute with a header from six yards out after a free kick from the left by Maksym Kalynychenko. Maksym Kalynychenko got the fourth goal in the 84th minute after a low cross from Andriy Shevchenko from the left which he shot right footed to the roof of the net.

Ukraine vs Tunisia
In the 70th minute, Shevchenko was tripped in the penalty box by Karim Hagui and scored from the resulting penalty, shooting right footed to the goalkeepers left as he dived to his right. Ukraine's victory sealed second spot in the group and a second round match against Switzerland. Vyacheslav Sviderskyi and Andriy Rusol were both suspended from the second round after picking up bookings in the match.

Second round – Switzerland vs Ukraine

Quarter-final – Italy vs Ukraine

Record players

Seven players have been fielded in all five of Ukraine's FIFA World Cup matches. Of those seven, Andriy Nesmachniy, Anatoliy Tymoshchuk and goalkeeper Oleksandr Shovkovskyi have not missed a single minute.

Top goalscorers

Ukraine's team captain and superstar Andriy Shevchenko was the only player to score more than one goal at the 2006 World Cup.

Notes

References

External links
Ukraine at FIFA

 
Countries at the FIFA World Cup
Fifa World Cup